Governor Knight may refer to:

Goodwin Knight (1896–1970), 31st Governor of California
Nehemiah R. Knight (1780–1854), 9th Governor of Rhode Island